Thought Leader is a collaborative news and opinion platform owned by the South African newspaper Mail & Guardian. It was named a Webby Award Honoree in 2008, won 2008 SA Blog of the Year, and has scored a few firsts, including sending the first South African blogger, Ndumiso Ngcobo, to cover a major political event – the 2007 ANC national conference in Polokwane.

In 2010 it was named as the forum where "most analytic discussion of sexual violence" was taking place by the Tshwaranang Legal Advocacy Centre, which conducted a study on the reporting of sexual violence in South Africa.

Notable contributors

 Richard Calland
 Andrea Mitchell
 Anton Harber
 Brendan O'Neill
 Bruce Cohen
 Erik Hersman
 Jonathan Berger
 Khadija Sharife
 Marius Redelinghuys
 Matthew Buckland
 Na'eem Jeenah
 Patricia de Lille
 Pierre de Vos
 Sarah Britten
 Sheila Camerer
 Steven Friedman
 Trevor Ncube

References

External links
Thought Leader wins blog of the year Kyoko Hasegawa, Daniel Rook 2008
More honours for Thought Leader Kyoko Hasegawa, Daniel Rook 2008
The best of Thought Leader Aliki Karasaridis 2009
Debating race isn't backward Aliki Karasaridis 2009
Gender coverage: Thought Leader leads the pack Lisa van Wyk 2010
The new Thought Leader Aliki Karasaridis 2011

South African news websites